The Flying Car is a six-minute 2002 short film written and directed by Kevin Smith. It stars Brian O'Halloran and Jeff Anderson as the View Askewniverse characters Dante Hicks and Randal Graves, who were introduced in Clerks.

The short film was the first commissioned for The Tonight Show and premiered there on February 27, 2002. It also appears on the 10th anniversary Clerks X DVD. The DVD cut is remastered and features an introduction by Kevin Smith.

Plot
While stuck in a traffic jam, Dante and Randal have another philosophical, pop culture-laden conversation — this one sparked when Randal asks Dante what he would hypothetically sacrifice in exchange for marketing rights to a flying car from The Jetsons. The hypothetical scenarios Randal continues to suggest grow increasingly ridiculous, culminating in Dante agreeing to have his foot cut off with a hacksaw, get knocked out, and get molested by the German inventor and his friends in exchange for the flying car. Randal expresses disgust that Dante would "do it with a bunch of guys just to get a car".

Cast
 Brian O'Halloran as Dante Hicks
 Jeff Anderson as Randal Graves

References

External links
 
 
 The Flying Car at View Askew's Web site; includes the film in QuickTime, RealVideo and Windows Media formats
 Transcript
 The Flying Car on Kevin Smith's YouTube channel

2002 short films
2002 television films
2002 films
2002 LGBT-related films
View Askew Productions films
View Askewniverse films
Films produced by Scott Mosier
Films directed by Kevin Smith
Films with screenplays by Kevin Smith
Films about automobiles